This is a list of Dutch television related events from 1958.

Events
11 February - Corry Brokken is selected to represent Netherlands at the 1958 Eurovision Song Contest with her song "Heel de wereld". She is selected to be the third Dutch Eurovision entry during Nationaal Songfestival held at AVRO Studios in Hilversum.
12 March - The 3rd Eurovision Song Contest is held at the Algemene Vereniging Radio Omroep in Hilversum. France wins the contest with the song "Dors, mon amour" performed by André Claveau. The year marks the first time the contest was won by the male solo singer.

Debuts
17 September - Pipo de Clown (1958-1980)

Television shows

1950s
NOS Journaal (1956–present)

Ending this year

Births
20 January - Paula Patricio, Portuguese-born TV presenter
22 March - Astrid Joosten, TV presenter, actress & writer

Deaths